, also referred to as , is a 2015 Japanese mecha drama anime series and the fourteenth incarnation to Sunrise's long-running Gundam franchise. It is directed by Tatsuyuki Nagai and written by Mari Okada, a team which previously collaborated on Toradora! and Anohana: The Flower We Saw That Day. It aired in Japan on MBS and other JNN stations on October 4, 2015, making this the first Gundam series to return to a Sunday late afternoon time slot since Mobile Suit Gundam AGE. On American television, the series began airing on Adult Swim's Toonami programming block on June 5, 2016, making it the first Gundam series to air in the United States since Syfy's airing of Mobile Suit Gundam 00 in 2008–09.

For episodes 1–13, the series' opening theme song is titled "Raise your flag", performed by Man with a Mission, while the ending theme is "Orphans no Namida" performed by Misia and co-written by Shiro Sagisu. For episodes 14–25, the opening theme is "Survivor" by Blue Encount, while the ending theme is titled  by TRUE.

Episodes

Season 1 (2015–16)

Season 2 (2016–17)

Notes

References

Mobile Suit Gundam: Iron-Blooded Orphans
Iron-Blooded Orphans